Allan Ian Carswell, CM, FRSC (born 1933) is an internationally recognized leader in the field of laser radar (lidar) applications since the technology's beginning in the early 1960s.  Carswell has been actively engaged in the study of the properties and applications of lasers and coherent optical frequency radiation since 1963. He was a member of the Plasma Physics Laboratory at the RCA Victor Research Laboratories in Montreal, Quebec, Canada, studying electromagnetic waves with ionized gas systems. In 1965, Carswell was appointed Director of the RCA Optical and Microwave Research Laboratory, and led the group there that developed the first  laser in Canada and the first Canadian commercial HeNe laser.

Carswell was a respected Professor of Physics at Toronto, Ontario, Canada's York University, where he conducted laser research. His work included the investigation of the properties and applications of high-power , nitrogen and dye lasers, and the application of laser scattering techniques for remote sensing and environmental diagnostics.

In 1974, Carswell founded Optech and led the company from its inception. He became Chairman of the Board of Optech in 2000. Carswell founded Optech to develop the more practical applications of lidar systems, and the company has since grown to become a world leader in laser ranging applications, because of its widely recognized expertise in advanced electro-optical systems. Optech now has over 200 employees and conducts 90% of its business internationally.

Carswell is a co-investigator on the Phoenix Mars Mission,
launched in 2007, which will use lidar to measure dust particles in the air on Mars.

Carswell was elected a Fellow of the Royal Society of Canada in 1984.
In 2006 Carswell was honoured with the John H. Chapman Award of Excellence by the Canadian Space Agency (CSA) for his significant achievements and lifelong dedication to space science and development in Canada. Dr. Carswell became a Member of the Order of Canada in 2005. 

Carswell continues to actively participate in both Optech and the development of lidar technologies as part of his lifelong endeavor to develop cutting-edge technologies.

The Allan I. Carswell Observatory is named after him.

References 

1933 births
Living people
Canadian physicists
Fellows of the Royal Society of Canada
Members of the Order of Canada
Academic staff of York University
Presidents of the Canadian Association of Physicists